Shuttering may refer to:

 Formwork, used in concrete construction (UK usage)
 Window shutter, a solid window covering

See also
 Shutter (disambiguation)